Events from the year 1744 in Sweden

Incumbents
 Monarch – Frederick I

Events

 30 January - Execution of Skinnar Per Andersson.
 March - The threatening war with Denmark is prevented by a treaty between Sweden and Denmark. 
 July - The Empire of Russia agree to recall their troops from Sweden. 
 18 August - The wedding between Crown Prince Adolf Frederick and Louisa Ulrika of Prussia on Drottningholm Palace. 
 August - Creation of the L'Ordre de l'Harmonie.
 By royal letter, the right to sell Tobacco in the Swedish cities is reserved for women in need of support, ruined male burghers and war invalids: this is confirmed a second time in 1772, then with the addition that the tobacco sellers are only permitted to employ females or non-adult males.

Births

 29 January - Catharina Charlotta Swedenmarck, writer  (died 1813) 
 9 June – Frans Suell, businessperson  (died 1818) 
 15 July – Maria Kristina Kiellström, the role model of Ulla Winblad  (died 1798) 
 
 

 December 15 or 25 - Elsa Fougt, printer, publisher, book importer and newspaper editor  (died 1826) 
 - Charlotte Du Rietz, love interest of Gustav III (died 1820) 
 - Jacob Guntlack, notorious thief (died 1771)

Deaths

 30 January - Skinnar Per Andersson, rebel leader (born 1703)
 February - Hedvig Taube, royal mistress  (born 1714)
 25 April - Anders Celsius, astronomer, physicist and mathematician  (born 1701)

References

 
Years of the 18th century in Sweden
Sweden